There are 19 Interstate Highways—8 primary and 11 auxiliary—that exist entirely or partially in the U.S. state of North Carolina.


Primary Interstates

Auxiliary Interstates

Business routes

See also

References

External links

 North Carolina Interstates at AARoads
 Interstate Guide
 North Carolina's New and Future Interstates at Malmeroads.net

Interstate Highways